The steeple ball (also tower ball from ) is a closed, typically rounded, capsule on the finial of many buildings in the German-speaking countries. A steeple ball is highly visible and hard to reach for repairs, so attention is paid to the quality of design, construction, and materials. The combination of durability and inaccessibility makes the steeple ball attractive for use as a time capsule. Shiny and visible from many places in the city, capsules are also used as target points during geodetic surveying.

See also 
 Time ball

References

Sources
 
 Anne-Chantal Zimmermann: Briefkästen und Zeitkapseln. Eine kleine Geschichte der Turmkugeln des Rathauses von Sursee. Masterarbeit, 2010.

Weblinks 
 Inhalt der Turmkugel vom Stephansdom
 Turmkugel des Klosters Fahr

Architectural elements